Cardwell may refer to:

Places

Australia
Cardwell, Queensland

United States
Cardwell, Missouri
Cardwell, Montana
Cardwell Hall, Kansas State University

Canada
Cardwell Parish, New Brunswick

People
Alvin B. Cardwell (1902–1992), American physicist
Dale Cardwell (born 1962), American consumer advocate and journalist
Don Cardwell (1935–2008), American baseball player
Edward Cardwell (1787–1861), English theologian
Edward Cardwell, 1st Viscount Cardwell (1813–1886), 19th Century English politician and Secretary of State for War
John Edwin Cardwell, British missionary in China
Joi Cardwell (born 1967), musician
Joshua Cardwell (1910–1982), Northern Ireland politician
Lloyd Cardwell (1913–1997), American football player
Louis Cardwell (1912–1986), English footballer
Paul Cardwell (born 1958), British advertising executive
Richard H. Cardwell (1845–1931), American lawyer and politician
Steve Cardwell (born 1950), Canadian ice hockey player
Vicki Cardwell (born 1955), Australian squash player

Things
Cardwell Reforms of the British army
Cardwell (electoral district), a former Canadian federal electoral district